The Point-class cutter was a class of 82-foot patrol vessels designed to replace the United States Coast Guard's aging 83-foot wooden hull patrol boat being used at the time. The design utilized a mild steel hull and an aluminum superstructure. The Coast Guard Yard discontinued building the 95-foot  to have the capacity to produce the 82-foot Point-class patrol boat in 1960. They served as patrol vessels used in law enforcement and search and rescue along the coasts of the United States and the Caribbean. They also served in Vietnam during the Vietnam War. They were replaced by the 87-foot s beginning in the late 1990s.

Naming the class
Following the Coast Guard custom in place in 1960 of not naming vessels under 100 feet in length, the first 44 Point-class patrol boats were only identified by their hull number using the scheme of WPB-823xx, where 82 was the design length of the hull. Beginning in January 1964, the Coast Guard started naming all vessels 65 feet in length and over. The 82-foot patrol boats were all given geographical "Point" names.

Design and production
The design of the 82-foot patrol boat actually began in the early 1950s with the introduction of the 95-foot patrol boat, which was introduced to replace the aging wooden gasoline-powered 83-foot patrol boats produced during World War II. The 95-foot patrol boat was originally developed as a search and rescue boat to replace the less capable 83-foot boat. With the outbreak of the Korean War and the requirement by the Coast Guard to secure port facilities in the United States under the Moss-Magnuson Act, the complete replacement of the 83-foot boat was deferred and the 95-foot boat was used for harbor patrols. 

With the goal of reducing manning requirements, the Point-class patrol boat was designed to accommodate an eight-man crew, a reduction from the 15-man crews of the Cape-class cutter. Production started in early 1960 at the Coast Guard Yard at Curtis Bay, Maryland and continued through late December 1963, producing 44 boats. The first 30 boats were powered by two  Cummins diesel engines, except for 82314 (later Point Thatcher), which was powered by two  gas turbine engines with controllable pitch propellers and 82318 (later Point Herron) which had two  Cummins diesels installed. Beginning in March 1962 with 82331 (later Point Marone), all boats were equipped with two 800-horsepower Cummins diesel engines. All were equipped with twin propellers. Eventually all boats were upgraded to the same 800-horsepower main engines used in the later production. 

In 1966 a contract for the production of 25 additional boats was awarded to J.M. Martinac Shipbuilding Corp. of Tacoma, Washington. All 25 were equipped with the twin 800-horsepower engines of the 1962 and later Yard production. In 1970, the last nine boats of the class were produced at the Yard utilizing the 800-horsepower design of the remainder of the class. Those boats in service in 1990 were refit with Caterpillar diesel main drive engines. Engine exhaust was ported through the transom rather than through a conventional stack permitting a 360-degree view from the bridge a useful feature in search and rescue work.

The design specifications for the 82-foot cutter included a steel hull, an aluminum superstructure with a longitudinally framed construction to save weight. Controls were located on the bridge which allowed one-man operation and eliminated an engineer watch in the engine room. For short periods, a crew of four men could operate the cutter, however, the need for rest brought the practical crew to eight for normal service. Berthing spaces were provided for 13 so that requirements were met for passengers and extra wartime manning needs.166</ref> 

The screws were designed for ease of replacement and could be changed without removing the cutter from the water. A clutch-in idle speed of three knots helped to conserve fuel on lengthy patrols and she had an eighteen knot maximum speed.  Already part of the design, crews stationed in Vietnam found the air-conditioned interior especially helpful. Interior access to the deckhouse was through a watertight door on the starboard side aft of the deckhouse. The deckhouse contained the cabin for the officer-in-charge and the executive petty officer but for Vietnam service the spaces quartered the commanding officer, the executive officer and chief boatswain's mate as well as the chief engineman. The deckhouse also included a small arms locker, scuttlebutt, desk and head. Access to the lower deck and engine room was via a ladder, at the bottom of which was the galley, mess and recreation deck. A watertight door at the front of the mess bulkhead led to the crew quarters which was ten feet long with six stowable bunks, three on each side. Forward of the bunks was the crew's head with sink, shower and commode, interior spaces were air-conditioned. Accommodation for a 13-man crew were installed for Vietnam War service.

History

Domestic service

A total of 79 Point-class cutters were used for law enforcement and search-and-rescue patrol boats beginning in 1960. The cutters were mostly co-located with Coast Guard stations along the Atlantic, Pacific and Gulf coasts. Point-class cutters were phased out in the late 1990s by the introduction of the Marine Protector-class coastal patrol boat with the last Point-class cutter being decommissioned in 2003.

Vietnam service

At the request of the U.S. Navy, 26 of the Point-class cutters were transported to Vietnam to serve with Coast Guard crews under U.S. Navy control during Operation Market Time. Coast Guard Squadron One was commissioned at Alameda, California on 27 May 1965. Crews immediately began training and preparation for overseas deployment. All USCG Point-class cutters in Vietnam were later turned over to the South Vietnamese Navy as part of the Vietnamization of the war effort.

When North Vietnam overtook the South the then-South Vietnamese Navy cutters had varied fates. Some were captured and incorporated into the Vietnam People's Navy. A few South Vietnamese boats were scuttled, and some by fleeing South Vietnamese military and civilians to successfully escape to the Philippines. The boats that sailed to the Philippines were pressed into service by the Philippine Navy, boats decommissioned in the 1980s, at which time the boats sold for scrap or to the private market.

Replacement
When planning the replacement for the Point-class cutter, designers took into consideration the need for different berthing arrangements that would accommodate a mixed-gender crew. Another important feature lacking on the Point-class cutter that was desired on a replacement was a stern launch ramp for the rapid deployment of the cutter's small boat for use in search-and-rescue missions and in law-enforcement work. Both of these requirements were designed into the Marine Protector-class that began replacing the Point-class cutters during the late 1990s. The last Point-class cutter was replaced in 2003.

Commissioning, homeport, and disposition information
Legend:

Notes

Footnotes

Citations

References cited

External links
 "Point" Class 82-foot WPBs Coast Guard Historian's website
 CG-275-1: Organization Manual For Coast Guard Patrol Boats WPB's 82' and 83', August, 1959 Coast Guard Historian's website

Ships of the United States Coast Guard
 
Patrol boat classes